Potanthus serina, the large dart,  is a species of butterfly of the family Hesperiidae. It is found on the Andamans, as well as in southern Burma, Singapore and the Philippines. The habitat consists of grassy areas and mangrove areas.

Taxonomy
It was formerly treated as a subspecies of Potanthus hetaerus.

References

Potanthus
Butterflies of Asia
Lepidoptera of the Philippines
Butterflies of Singapore
Fauna of the Andaman and Nicobar Islands
Butterflies described in 1883